Raúl Fretes (born 13 September 1965) is a Paraguayan professional golfer.

Fretes was born in Asunción and turned pro in 1990. He won the South American Tour Order of Merit in 1994 and 1998. He won the 2005 World Golf Teachers Cup.

Fretes played on the Tour de las Américas and his best finish was second in the TLA Players Championship in 2003 and the Center Open in 2007.

Professional wins (19)

Asia Golf Circuit wins (1)
1995 China Open

Argentine wins (3)
1991 Mendoza Open
1999 Misiones Open
2000 Misiones Open

South American Tour wins (8)
1992 Los Inkas Peru Open
1993 Paraguay Open
1994 Los Leones Open (Chile), Uruguay Open
1995 Los Inkas Peru Open
1998 Argentine Masters, Argentine Open
2001 Mexico Masters

Other wins (7)
1994 Chile Open
1995 Callaway Cup (Paraguay)
2001 Paraguay Open, Srixon Championship (USA, Montgomery Tour)
2002 Rio Grande Open (Brazil)
2005 Carlos Franco Invitational
2008 Golf Tour 5 Tournament (Brazil)

Team appearances
Amateur
Eisenhower Trophy (representing Paraguay): 1986
Los Andes Cup (South American Cup): 1989

Professional
Alfred Dunhill Cup (representing Paraguay): 1993, 1994, 1999
World Cup (representing Paraguay): 1992, 1997, 1999

References

External links

Paraguayan male golfers
Sportspeople from Asunción
1965 births
Living people
20th-century Paraguayan people